Grace Gutierrez is a Chicana artist who focuses on a variety of forms of arts such as painting, photography, murals, ceramics, and video art. Gutierrez is known for creating different works that indulge her Chicana identity along with a focus on other aspects such as the small-town experience.

Biography 
Grace Gutierrez was born and raised in Longmont, Colorado and continues to live there. From a young age, Gutierrez grew very fond of art and in high school it become clear to her that it was something she wanted to consider and pursue as a career. In 2017, Gutierrez returned to school after a seven-year break and attended Front Range Community College where she received her Associate of Arts in 2018.  She continued her education at Metro State University located in Denver and received her Bachelor of Fine Arts in 2020. Although her work mediums are varying, Gutierrez mainly places a focus on creating ceramics and paintings.

Art (murals, projects, ceramics) 
 Mujer de Las Tortugas (Woman of the Turtles) is a mural that depicts a woman in the center of the piece that is surrounded by the sea and multiple turtles. This design was created and inspired by the appreciation that Chicanx people have for the planet. Ancient Indigenous tribes in Mexico believed there was a connection between turtles and the planet, therefore tying back to this belief, Gutierrez was influenced by the idea and created this design. The message that Gutierrez evokes with the creation of the mural is to take care of the planet and appreciate what it provides for everyone in the world.
 Yo Soy Animal (I Am Animal) is a series of different paintings made with acrylic paint, with the addition of accompanying ceramic works to them. In their essence it captures the Chicana experience and explores various aspects such as Mexican folklore and literature. It includes the depiction of animals alongside the female figures within the paintings, that add to the overall meaning of the piece as there is an existing symbolism of the animal, that then contributes the message of the artist. 
 Paintings and Installations:
 Iguanas-Tribute to Iturbide
 Dog-Loyal Guide
 Resplendent Quetzal
 Jaguar
 Ceramic Works:
 Iguanas: is a piece of ceramic work and was created in 2020. The work consists of three detailed iguanas that are painted with a variety of greens, blues, and yellows.
 Sleeping Dogs: depicts a brown colored dog who is sleeping in a curled-up position. This work of ceramics was created in 2020.
 FC Mural Project is a project that Gutierrez took part in, where she created a mural in Fort Collins, Colorado in the year 2020. It is displayed with different vibrant colors and the main figure of it is a woman surrounded by two green birds, one of them resting near her hand.

References

External links 
 https://www.instagram.com/gracerspeedracer/
 https://www.gracegutierrezstudio.com/

1989 births
Living people
21st-century American women artists
American women painters
Artists from Colorado
Hispanic and Latino American women in the arts
People from Longmont, Colorado